The 2010–11 season was the 107th season of competitive football in Spain.

The season began on 8 August 2010 for the Copa Federación, 25 August 2010 for the Copa del Rey and 28 August for La Liga and the other three divisions. The season ended on 21 May 2011 for La Liga, on 18 June 2011 for Segunda División and on 26 June for the other two divisions.

Transfer Windows

Promotion and relegation (pre-season)
Teams promoted to 2010–11 La Liga
 Real Sociedad
 Hércules CF
 Levante UD

Teams relegated from 2009–10 La Liga
 Real Valladolid
 CD Tenerife
 Xerez CD

Teams promoted to 2010–11 Segunda División
 Granada CF
 SD Ponferradina
 AD Alcorcón
 FC Barcelona B

Teams relegated from 2009–10 Segunda División
 Cádiz CF
 Real Murcia
 Real Unión
 CD Castellón

Teams promoted to 2010–11 Segunda División B
 Deportivo B
 CF Gandía
 CD Atlético Baleares
 CD Alcalá
 Real Sociedad B
 CD Teruel
 CD Badajoz
 Caudal Deportivo
 Rayo Vallecano B
 Getafe CF B
 Yeclano Deportivo
 Jumilla CF
 Coruxo FC
 FC Santboià
 CD La Muela
 UD Alzira
 Peña Sport FC
 Extremadura UD
 CE L'Hospitalet

Teams relegated from 2009–10 Segunda División B
 Sestao River
 CD Izarra
 Racing Ferrol
 SD Compostela
 CD Toledo
 Racing de Santander B
 CF Villanovense
 CD Tenerife B
 UD Lanzarote
 RCD Espanyol B
 Villajoyosa CF
 Valencia CF Mestalla
 CF Gavà
 Terrassa FC
 Real Murcia B
 Moratalla CF
 Jerez Industrial CF
 UD Marbella

National team
The home team is on the left column; the away team is on the right column.

UEFA Euro qualifiers
Spain was in Group I of the Euro 2012 qualification process.

Friendlies

Honours

Trophy & League Champions

League tables

La Liga

Segunda División

Segunda División B

Tercera División

References

 
Spa